Euplexia discisignata is a species of moth of the family Noctuidae. It is found in India (including Darjeeling).

References

Moths described in 1867
Euplexia